The first season of Faking It, an American single-camera romantic comedy, starred Rita Volk, Katie Stevens, Gregg Sulkin, Michael Willett and Bailey De Young. It was developed by Carter Covington and created by Dana Min Goodman and Julia Wolov, premiered on April 22, 2014, and concluded on June 10, 2014, on the MTV network. The season featured 8 episodes.

Plot
Hester High School is a place where being different is what makes you popular. When outcast sophomore students Karma Ashcroft (Katie Stevens) and her best friend Amy Raudenfeld (Rita Volk) are mistaken for a lesbian couple, they find themselves the center of the school's attention, so they decide to go along with the charade.

They are invited to a party hosted by popular gay student Shane Harvey (Michael Willett). With the intention of impressing Shane's best friend, Liam Booker (Gregg Sulkin), Karma attends the party with Amy, who is not entirely sure she wants to continue with the lie. When they are unexpectedly nominated as homecoming queens, they are forced to kiss in front of the entire school in order to maintain their new popular status, but Amy is slowly discovering that she might not actually be faking it.

Cast and characters

Main cast

 Katie Stevens as Karma Ashcroft
 Rita Volk as Amy Raudenfeld
 Gregg Sulkin as Liam Booker
 Michael Willett as Shane Harvey
 Bailey De Young as Lauren Cooper

Recurring cast
 Rebecca McFarland as Farrah
 Senta Moses as Penelope Bevier
 Erick Lopez as Tommy Ortega
 Courtney Kato as Leila
 Breezy Eslin as Elizabeth
 Anthony Palacios as Pablo
 Amy Farrington as Molly
 Lance Barber as Lucas
 Dan Gauthier as Bruce Cooper
 Courtney Henggeler as Robin

Guest star
 Sofia Carson as Soleil

Production
On October, 2013, MTV announced series orders for Faking It and Happyland, both consisting of eight episodes each. All episodes were broadcast on the time slot of Tuesdays from 10:30 PM–11:00 PM EST.

Episodes

Reception

Reviews
Faking It received generally favorable reviews from critics, receiving a 71 score on Metacritic, based on eight reviews as well as a 71% for season 1 on Rotten Tomatoes based on seven reviews.
New York Times said the following: "Faking It isn't anything more than a smarter-than-average high school comedy, but there's a freshness to it, perhaps because so many of the key people involved are relative newcomers."
New York Daily News said, "The engine driving this show is female friendship, the kind strong enough to get you through even high school. For Amy and Karma, we want that." And Entertainment Weekly stated, "Credit the winning cast, especially Volk, and executive producer Carter Covington's sweet/snarky tone for a half hour viewers won't have to pretend to love."

Awards and nominations

Home media
The show is available for digital download on iTunes and Amazon.com. Although there hasn't been a wide DVD/BD release, on October 15, 2014, "The Complete Season 1" was made available for purchase in DVD (Region 1) format per Manufactured on Demand (MOD) on Amazon.com

References

External links

2014 American television seasons